John McIntosh Beattie (4 January 1905 – 10 January 1972), known professionally as John Warwick,  was an Australian actor, and television dramatist.

Early life
He was born John McIntosh Beattie (many sources give "Beattle") at Bellingen, New South Wales, Australia.  He took the name Warwick from his secondary school.

Acting career
Warwick had an extensive career over 40 years, beginning in Australian cinema in the early 1930s (he is attributed with introducing Errol Flynn, a personal acquaintance in Sydney, to acting by bringing him along to a casting session when In the Wake of the Bounty was being filmed).

After relocating to England he was trained as an actor at Harrogate theatre with the repertory company "The White Rose Players", afterwards moving into British cinema in the late 1930s–1940s, and television from the 1950s. In the 1960s he returned to Australia and ended his career in television drama and cinema there.

Death
He died on 10 January 1972 at the age of 67, in Sydney, Australia.

Personal life
He was married twice, first to Dorothy Georgina Beattie (filed for divorce in 1927 and decree absolute granted in 1929), and secondly to New Zealand-born actress Molly Raynor (1903–1976).

Partial filmography

 On Our Selection (1932) – Jim Carey
 In the Wake of the Bounty (1933) – Midshipman Young
 The Squatter's Daughter (1933) – Clive Sherrington
 The Silence of Dean Maitland (1934) – Dr. Henry Everard
 Find the Lady (1936) – (uncredited)
 Double Alibi (1937) – Charlie
 Lucky Jade (1937) – John Marsden
 Catch as Catch Can (1937) – Eddie Fallon
 The Ticket of Leave Man (1937) – Robert Brierly
 Passenger to London (1937) – Frank Drayton
 A Yank at Oxford (1938) – Minor Role (uncredited)
 John Halifax (1938) – John Halifax
 This Man Is News (1938) – Johnnie Clayton
 Me and My Pal (1939) – Charlie
 Dead Men are Dangerous (1939) – Goddard
 The Mind of Mr. Reeder (1939) – Ted Bracher
 The Face at the Window (1939) – Lucien Cortier
 Flying Fifty-Five (1939) – Jebson
 Riding High (1939) – George Davenport
 21 Days (1940) – (uncredited)
 All at Sea (1940) – Brown
 The Case of the Frightened Lady (1940) – Studd
 Spare a Copper (1940) – Shaw
 Old Bill and Son (1941) – Recruiting Officer (uncredited)
 The Saint's Vacation (1941) – Gregory
 This England (1941) – Norman (uncredited)
 My Wife's Family (1941) – Jack Gay
 Danny Boy (1941) – Nick Carter
 The Missing Million (1942) – Bennett
 The Day Will Dawn (1942) – Milligan, Reporter in Fleet Street Pub
 Talk About Jacqueline (1942) – Donald Clark
 Teheran (1946) – Maj. 'Mack' MacIntyre, UK
 Woman to Woman (1947) – Dr. Gavron
 Dancing with Crime (1947) – Det. Insp. Carter
 While I Live (1947) – George Grant
 The Franchise Affair (1951) – Carley
 Pool of London (1951) – Inspector Jim Moss (uncredited)
 The Lavender Hill Mob (1951) – Police Inspector at Squad Car Headquarters (uncredited)
 High Treason (1951) – Inspector Hewitt (uncredited)
 Never Look Back (1952) – Inspector Raynor
 Circumstantial Evidence (1952) – Pete Hanken
 The Gentle Gunman (1952) – Prisoners Escort On Ship (uncredited)
 Escape Route (1952) – Security Chief Brice
 Street Corner (1953) – Insp. Gray
 Trouble in Store (1953) – Robson
 Bang! You're Dead (1954) – Sgt. Gurney
 Up to His Neck (1954) – Lt Truman
 Dangerous Voyage (1954) – Carter
 Contraband Spain (1955) – Bryant, manager of the Sportadrome
 The Long Arm (1956) – Detective-Inspector at Shipping Office
 Town on Trial (1957) – Inspector Hughes (uncredited)
 Just My Luck (1957) – 1st Ambulance Man (uncredited)
 Gideon's Day (1958) – Insp. Gillick (uncredited)
 Law and Disorder (1958) – Police Superintendent
 The Square Peg (1959) – Colonel Layton
 Horrors of the Black Museum (1959) – Insp. Lodge
 The Desperate Man (1959) – Inspector Cobley
 Murder at Site 3 (1959) – Cmdr. Chambers
The Fourth Square (1961) – Police Sergeant
 Go to Blazes (1962) – Fireman
 Cobwebs in Concrete (1968) – TV play – writer
 Adam's Woman (1970) – Croyden
 Demonstrator (1971) – Frank Jamieson
 The Lady from Peking (1975) – Inspector (Last appearance)

Writing Credits
Waiting in the Wings (1965)
Daphne Laureola (1965)

References

External links
 

1905 births
1972 deaths
Australian male film actors
20th-century Australian male actors